Richard R. Kiddle House is a historic house in Friend, Nebraska. It was built in 1886 by carpenter Richard R. Kiddle, and designed in the Second Empire architectural style.

The house has been listed on the National Register of Historic Places since September 12, 1985.

References

External links

		
National Register of Historic Places in Saline County, Nebraska
Second Empire architecture in Nebraska
Houses completed in 1886